Two Minutes to Play is a 1936 American sports comedy film directed by Robert F. Hill. Martin Granville (Brix), the son of a disgraced college football player, enrolls in his father's college and joins the football team after being charmed into it by the flirtatious Pat Meredith (Martel). He begins dating Meredith who, in turn, is dating several other young men. When the inebriated team captain Jack Gaines (Nugent) gets into a fight, Granville takes the blame. Granville is suspended until Gaines confesses, and Gaines wins the game for the college. Meredith marries a millionaire.

Cast
Herman Brix – Martin Granville
Jeanne Martel – Pat Meredith
Forrest Taylor – Coach Rodney
Edward Nugent – Jack Gaines
Duncan Renaldo – Lew Ashley

References

External links
 
 
 
 
Review of film at Variety

1936 films
1930s English-language films
American black-and-white films
Victory Pictures films
Films directed by Robert F. Hill
American sports comedy films
1930s sports comedy films
1936 comedy films
1930s American films